Tsuen Wan Public Ho Chuen Yiu Memorial College (TWPHCYMC) is an English-as-a-medium-of-instruction (EMI) secondary school located at Shek Wai Kok Estate, Tsuen Wan, Hong Kong.

History
The school is named after Ho Chuen-yiu, a Tsuen Wan businessman and community leader. He founded the Tsuen Wan Rural Committee and served two terms as the chairman of the Heung Yee Kuk.

The school was founded in 1977 and moved to its current campus in 1978.

Following the handover of Hong Kong in 1997, the Hong Kong government announced that the default medium of instruction would be Chinese, requiring approval from the Education Department for continued use of English. Many EMI schools were thereafter forced to become Chinese-as-a-medium-of-instruction (CMI) schools. TWPHCYMC was one of the schools permitted to continue teaching in English.

Tsang Chi-kin (曾志健), a TWPHCYMC form five student, was shot in the chest by the police during the 2019–20 Hong Kong protests. The shooting took place in Tsuen Wan during territory-wide unrest on 1 October 2019, China's National Day. Students of TWPHCYMC and other schools protested the following day in support of the student, who survived, and alleged police brutality. Tsang was charged with rioting and assaulting the police. In December 2020 it was reported that Tsang and his girlfriend had escaped Hong Kong and gone into exile.

Following the shooting, the school stated that Tsang would not be expelled. This prompted criticism from Chinese sources, such as the Xinhua News Agency, a mouthpiece of the Chinese Communist Party, which published an editorial attacking the school and Hong Kong educators in general.

School facilities
The school has a computer-assisted learning centre, computerised music room, computerised art room, computer room, student union room, student activity centre, etc. All classrooms are equipped with computers and projectors. All rooms are air-conditioned.

Extra-curricular activities
There are four houses: Integrity, Elegance, Loyalty and Benevolence. More than 10 clubs and societies of academic, service, sports or other interests are also organized.

Healthy school policy
Objectives:
1. To develop a healthy school culture
2. To encourage a healthy lifestyle among students

See also
 Education in Hong Kong
 List of schools in Hong Kong

References

External links

 

Educational institutions established in 1977
Secondary schools in Hong Kong
Shek Wai Kok
1977 establishments in Hong Kong